Luis Cabral (born 8 July 1960) is a Guamanian archer. He competed in the men's individual event at the 1992 Summer Olympics.

References

External links
 

1960 births
Living people
Guamanian male archers
Olympic archers of Guam
Archers at the 1992 Summer Olympics
Place of birth missing (living people)